Ivo Kuusk (born 8 August 1937 in Konguta) is an Estonian opera singer (tenor).

He has been for a long time the leading soloist at Estonian National Opera.

In 2005, he was awarded with Order of the White Star, IV class.

References

Living people
1937 births
20th-century Estonian male opera singers
Estonian Academy of Music and Theatre alumni
Academic staff of the Estonian Academy of Music and Theatre
Recipients of the Order of the White Star, 4th Class
People from Elva Parish